Mound is a village in Madison Parish, Louisiana, United States. With a population of 12 at the 2000 census, it is Louisiana's smallest village by population. Its ZIP Code is 71282. It is part of the Tallulah Micropolitan Statistical Area.

History
The community was named for a Native American mound which stood at the original site.

Geography

Demographics

At the 2000 census there were 12 people, 4 households, and 4 families in the village. There were 5 housing units at an average density of 20.5 per square mile (8.0/km). The racial makeup of the village was 100.00% White.
50.0% had children under the age of 18 living with them, 100.0% were married couples living together, and 0.0% were non-families. No households were one person, and none had someone living alone who was 65 or older. The average household size was 3.00 and the average family size was 3.00.

The age distribution was 25.0% under the age of 18, 8.3% from 18 to 24, 25.0% from 25 to 44, 25.0% from 45 to 64, and 16.7% 65 or older. The median age was 42 years. For every 100 females, there were 50.0 males. For every 100 females age 18 and over, there were 80.0 males.

The median household income was in excess of $200,000, as was the median family income. Males and females had a median income over $100,000. The per capita income for the village was $92,200. There were 33.3% of families living below the poverty line and 50.0% of the population, including 50.0% of those under 18 and none of those over 64.

References

Villages in Madison Parish, Louisiana
Villages in Louisiana